Hotel Oregon, also known as Oakman Drugs, Oakman Glass, and Spartan Hotel, is a historic hotel building located at Spartanburg, Spartanburg County, South Carolina.  It was built in 1909, and is a three-story, brick building with two first floor storefronts.  It features horizontal granite belt courses, decorative brick panels, brick cornices, and a stepped front parapet.

It was listed on the National Register of Historic Places in 2001.

References

Hotel buildings on the National Register of Historic Places in South Carolina
Hotel buildings completed in 1909
Buildings and structures in Spartanburg, South Carolina
National Register of Historic Places in Spartanburg, South Carolina
Hotels established in 1909
1909 establishments in South Carolina